KISS NB (Keep It Simple Solutions, New Brunswick), founded in 2017, is a political party registered in the province of New Brunswick, Canada.

While the party fielded candidates in nine ridings during the 2018 New Brunswick provincial elections, no seats were won.

Gerald Bourque previously ran in the riding of Fredericton-York in the 2014 provincial election as an independent, receiving 2.9 per cent of the vote.

The party was deregistered on 31 October 2018 for failing to run at least ten candidates in the 2018 election.

The party was reregistered on 26 August 2020 as the KISS N.B. Political Party and fielded four candidates in the 2020 election.

Election results

Results by riding (2018)

Notes

References

External links 
 
 Registered Political parties

Political parties established in 2017
Provincial political parties in New Brunswick